The German Type IXB submarine was a sub-class of the German Type IX submarine built for Nazi Germany's Kriegsmarine between 1938 and 1940. The U-boats themselves were designed to be fairly large ocean-going submarines. The inspiration for the Type IXB submarine came from the earlier original Type IX submarine, the Type IXA submarine. The design of the IXA was developed to give an increased range, a change which resulted in a slightly heavier overall tonnage. This design was improved even further in the later Type IXC submarines.

The Type IXB submarines were the most successful class of submarine in the war in terms of the total amount to tonnage sunk, with each U-boat sinking an average of over  during its career.

Design and construction

Construction
All Type IXB submarines were ordered by the Nazi Germany's Kriegsmarine between 16 July 1937 and 8 August 1939 as part of Plan Z and the overall German plan of re-armament in violation of the Treaty of Versailles. The design of the IXB submarines came from the initial Type IX submarines, the Type IXA. All contracts for the construction of the submarines were awarded to DeSchiMAG AG Weser, Bremen. The first U-boat to be laid down in the Bremen ship yards was U-65, whose keel was laid down on 6 December 1938. The last U-boat to be laid down was U-111, whose construction began on 20 February 1940. By the end of 1940, all Type IXB submarines had been fully constructed and commissioned into the Kriegsmarine.

Design
All Type IXB submarines had  while submerged and  when surfaced. As a result, they could travel at  while surfaced and  submerged. They had 6 torpedo tubes (4 in the bow, 2 in the stern) and carried a total of 22  torpedoes. Unlike the earlier Type IXAs, the Type IXB submarines were equipped with 44 TMA mines as well. The Type IXB submarines were equipped with a 10.5 cm SK C/32 naval gun with 180 rounds on a Utof mount. The last piece of armament that the Type IXB submarines were equipped with were the standard  anti-aircraft guns. All Type IXB submarines could hold up to 56 crew members at any given time though that number was usually around 45–48 crew members. After being commissioned and deployed, all of the Type IXB submarines built prior to the fall of France were stationed in the German port city of Wilhelmshaven while those who were commissioned following the capture of numerous French ports during the Battle of France were stationed in Lorient.

List of Type IXB U-boats
The Type IXB class had 14 U-boats, all of which were built by AG Weser of Bremen:

See also
German Type IX submarine
German Type IXA submarine

References

Bibliography

 
Submarine classes
World War II submarines of Germany